Delos is a genus of air-breathing land snails, terrestrial pulmonate gastropod mollusks in the family Rhytididae.

Species
Species within the genus Delos include:

 Delos ceresia
 Delos coresia
 Delos gardineri (E. A. Smith, 1897)
 Delos gradata
 Delos jeffreysiana
 Delos oualanensis
 Delos regia
 Delos striata

References

Rhytididae